London Files is an Indian Crime thriller webseries Directed By Sachin Pathak.The series starring Arjun Rampal and Purab Kohli in the lead. The series released on Voot on 21 April 2022.

Cast
Arjun Rampal as Detective Om Singh
Purab Kohli as Amar Roy
Gopal Dutt as Gopi
Sapna Pabbi as Ashwini
Amritanshu Kumar as Shubhro Biswas
Geetika Upadhyay as Simone
Medha Rana as Maya
Nisha Aaliya as Puja Singh
Manvir Bawa as Yash Singh
Adil Zubair as Rishi
Nicholas Benjamin as News Reader
Sagar Arya as Ranjh
Eva Jane willis as Catherine
Shanice Archer as Carol
Hadas K. Kershaw as Ursula
Ruchika Jain as Mrinal
Daisy Louve as Daisy
Karis Pentecost as Sarah Jones
Warren Palmer as Harry
Shiraz Khan as Joshi Ji

Reception
London Files received mixed reviews from critics, with some describing it as promising but criticizing its writing and acting. Others criticized its pacing. The Times of India reviewed the show more positively, praising its writing, pacing, and "unpredictability."

References

External links

2022 crime action films